Mait Metsanurk (born Eduard Hubel, 19 November 1879 – 21 August 1957) was an Estonian writer who led the neo-realist school of Estonian literature.

Early years 
Mait Metsanurk was born as the youngest of eight children in a peasant family in Saare farmstead, Metsanuka (now Tartu Parish), in the Kreis Dorpat of the Governorate of Livonia. He attended elementary school in Orge and a Russian-speaking city school in Tartu. He worked in various positions, first as an office clerk, then as a schoolteacher and from 1906 as a journalist. He is buried at the Metsakalmistu cemetery in Tallinn.

Career 
Mait Metsanurk reached his literary breakthrough in 1908 with his realistic portrayal of Estonian town and country life at the time. In particular, social contradictions and tensions were used in his work. He became one of the most prolific and popular writers and playwrights of his era. Together with A. H. Tammsaare (1878–1940), he is considered one of the most outstanding representatives of Estonian neo-realism of the interwar period. His main work, the historical novel Ümera jõel (On the Ümera River) (1934), depicts the struggle of the pagan Estonians against the Danish and German conquest in the thirteenth century. In addition, he worked as a literary critic and translator. 
In 1924-25 and from 1930 to 1936 Metsanurk was chairman of the Estonian Writers' Union. 
With the Soviet occupation of Estonia, Metsanurk was sidelined politically and expelled from the Writers' Union. He was rehabilitated in 1956, after the death of Stalin.

Literary work

Prose 
 (narrative, Tallinn 1908)
 (novel, Tallinn 1909)
 (short stories, Tallinn 1910)
 (novel, Tallinn 1912)
 (novella, Tallinn 1916)
! (Novel, 1918)
 (narrative, Tartu 1920)
 (narrative, Tallinn 1921)
 (novel, 1922)
 (novel, Tartu, 1925)
 (novel, Tartu, 1926)
 (short story collection, Tallinn 1927)
 (novel, Tartu, 1928)
 (stories and novellas, Tartu 1929)
 (novel, Tartu, 1930)
 (short story collection, Tartu, 1931)
 (narrative, Tartu 1932)
 (short story collection, Tartu, 1933)
 (youth narrative, Tartu, 1933)
Ümera jõel (novel, Tartu, 1934)
 (novel, Tartu, 1936)
 (diary novel, Tartu, 1937)
 (novel, Tartu, 1939)
 (Memories, Tallinn 1946)
 (novel, Tallinn 1957)

Plays 
 (Comedy, Tallinn 1908)
 (Comedy Tartu 1923)
 (Drama, Tartu, 1925)
 (Drama, Tartu, 1929)
 (Comedy, Tallinn 1931)
 (Comedy, Tallinn 1932)
 (Drama, Tartu, 1935)
 (Comedy, Tallinn 1938)

References 

1879 births
1957 deaths
People from Tartu Parish
People from Kreis Dorpat
Estonian People's Party politicians
Members of the Estonian Constituent Assembly
20th-century Estonian novelists
Estonian male novelists
Estonian male short story writers
Estonian dramatists and playwrights
Burials at Metsakalmistu